The Holland Society of New York was founded in New York City in 1885 to collect information respecting the settlement and history of New Netherland.  Its main objective is to find and preserve documentation about the inhabitants' lives and times so as to elucidate the political, social, and religious patterns in the Dutch colony.  The society sponsors historical publications, and provides resources for family studies and genealogy.  Many of its members are especially active in genealogical research and publication. The Holland Society originated the New Netherland Project, which is translating and publishing the 17th-century records held by the New York State Archives. Among other current sponsorships are The Papers of Jacob Leisler Project and Records of the Translations of the Reformed Protestant Dutch Church of Flatbush, Kings County, New York.

Membership consists of male and female descendants in the direct male line of an ancestor who lived in New Netherland before or during 1675. Notable members include Cecil B. DeMille, Humphrey Bogart, Theodore Roosevelt, and Franklin D. Roosevelt, who also served as a Trustee of the Society during his tenure as Governor of New York.

The Holland Society hosts an Annual Banquet in order to honor contributions made by an individual of Dutch descent. Past honorees include Henry Fonda, Gloria Vanderbilt, astronaut Jerry L. Ross, and Theodore Roosevelt, among others.

The Holland Society's library is an invaluable resource for those pursuing New Netherland studies, especially genealogy and family history. There are about 7,000 books of which 3,000 volumes deal with local history; 3,000 are family histories and genealogies, and 1,000 are reference books. There is also an extensive vertical file collection which includes letters, photographs, genealogies and press clippings, and a finding aid describing the collection is available on the Holland Society website. All Holland Society publications are included in the library collection. Copies of early church records provide information on births, marriages and deaths in New Netherland. These records number 109 volumes and are becoming computer accessible. The library subscribes to historical and genealogical society publications, collecting newsletters of family organizations with ancestry in New Netherland. While the collection focuses primarily on New Amsterdam and Hudson River settlements, it also follows early Dutch and allied migrations in North America.

This  collection has a large amount of information on the history and culture of the families of the Dutch colonies in America. The library is in the New York State Library in Albany, and may be used by the public by making an appointment with the office.

References

External links
 

Lineage societies
Dutch-American culture in New York City
New Netherland
Pre-statehood history of New York (state)
1885 establishments in New York (state)
Organizations established in 1885